Old 97's is an American rock band from Dallas, Texas. Formed in 1992, they have since released twelve studio albums, two full extended plays, shared split duty on another, and have one live album. Their most recent release is Twelfth. 

They were pioneers of the alt-country movement during the mid-to-late 1990s, then they developed more of a power pop style in the 2000s. Lead vocalist and primary songwriter Rhett Miller has described the band's style as "loud folk". The band's name is in reference to the Wreck of the Old 97.

Career
Initially a popular Dallas bar band, Old 97's toured the country after releasing their first album, 1994's Hitchhike to Rhome and 1995's split EP release Stoned / Garage Sale with fellow Dallas band Funland on Idol Records. In Chicago, they caught the attention of Bloodshot Records and were signed to record their next album. 1995's Wreck Your Life brought them to the attention of Elektra Records, who hoped that alt-country could be a new post-grunge trend. Lead singer Rhett Miller, born in Austin, later lived in New York City and Los Angeles. Many of the band's songs include local Texas references, with references to New York City, Los Angeles, and Chicago appearing as well.

Most songs are written and sung by Miller, with bassist Murry Hammond picking up the vocals on one or two tracks per album. Hammond also handled a number of country covers, especially in the band's earlier years. Hammond also performs gospel at his local church. The band's 2004 album Drag It Up also includes a song written and sung by guitarist Ken Bethea, "Coahuila."

In 2005, Blender magazine ranked the band's then most successful single, 1999's "Murder (Or a Heart Attack)", as the 176th greatest song "since you were born."  

Their music has been featured in a number of films and TV series, including The Break-Up ("Salome", "Melt Show", "Timebomb"), Clay Pigeons ("Timebomb"), Slither ("The New Kid"), Ned's Declassified School Survival Guide ("Big Brown Eyes"), Ed ("Question", "King of All the World"), Scrubs ("Question"), Veronica Mars ("Adelaide", "Four-Leaf Clover", "The New Kid") and Scorpion ("Question"). With respect to The Break-Up, a key scene toward the end of the film takes place at an Old 97's concert. 

Rhett Miller has recorded seven solo studio albums and one live album, with 2002's The Instigator receiving substantial airplay on alternative-oriented radio stations. He toured with Neil Finn in 2004. Miller's second major commercial album, The Believer, was released in February 2006. Murry Hammond's solo album, I Don't Know Where I'm Going But I'm on My Way, was released April 21, 2008.

Old 97's have been heralded as a great live band, although they claim never to rehearse their act. They included five live songs as a bonus disc on Satellite Rides, and released a live double CD set recorded at historic Gruene Hall in 2005, Alive & Wired.

Rhino Entertainment released Hit by a Train: The Best of Old 97's, an eighteen-track compilation of songs from the band's beginnings through 2001, featuring liner notes and an essay by rock critic Robert Christgau.

Satellite Riders is a faux "tribute band"—it is actually an alias the band performs under when contractual obligations prevent them from using the Old 97's name. The Ranchero Brothers is the name used when only Rhett and Murray Hammond perform. The recording of "Timebomb" from the live album Alive & Wired was made available for download along with other alt-country songs for the music video games Rock Band and Rock Band 2.

Their next studio project, The Grand Theatre, was released in two volumes. The first, The Grand Theatre, Volume One, was released on October 12, 2010. The second, The Grand Theatre, Volume Two, was released on July 5, 2011.

In 2013 the band released an EP containing two tracks with vocals by country music legend Waylon Jennings entitled Old 97's & Waylon Jennings. Rhett Miller called the previously unreleased tunes with Jennings "the band's 'holy grail.'"

The band's tenth studio album, Most Messed Up, was released April 29, 2014, by ATO Records and was their best-selling album to date, reaching #30 on the Billboard 200.

Their next two releases on ATO Records were Graveyard Whistling, their 11th studio album, released February 24, 2017, and Love the Holidays, an album of mostly original Christmas songs, released November 16, 2018.

ATO Records released the band's next studio album, aptly named Twelfth, on August 21, 2020. The twelve tracks were produced by Vance Powell, who produced Graveyard Whistling. Old 97's noted that the recording sessions in Nashville started on the night of a deadly  tornado outbreak and right before the COVID-19 pandemic hit.

The band members portrayed the alien rock band Bzermikitokolok and the Knowheremen in The Guardians of the Galaxy Holiday Special, singing the original song "I Don't Know What Christmas Is (But Christmastime Is Here)" and their 2018 song "Here It Is Christmastime," the latter with Kevin Bacon singing lead.

Band members

Current members
 Rhett Miller – lead vocals, rhythm guitar (1992–present)
 Murry Hammond – bass guitar, backing and lead vocals, acoustic guitar (1992–present)
 Ken Bethea – lead guitar, backing and lead vocals (1992–present)
 Philip Peeples – drums, backing vocals (1992–present)

Session substitutes
 Clark Vogeler – lead guitar (1994)
 Alan Wooley – lead guitar (1994)

Touring substitutes
 Fred Armisen – drums (2017)
 Jason Garner – drums (2017)

Discography

Albums

Singles

DVDs
 2005: Old 97's Live (New West Records)

References

External links

Old 97's Official web site
Official Rhett Miller Website
Hit By A Train, Fansite
July 2009 Interview with L.A.Record

1993 establishments in Texas
American alternative country groups
American power pop groups
Musical groups established in 1993
Musical groups from Dallas
New West Records artists
Bloodshot Records artists
Elektra Records artists
ATO Records artists